Carlos Iturraspe Cuevas (10 June 1910 – 10 August 1981) was a Spanish football midfielder and manager.

Football career
Born in San Sebastián, Gipuzkoa, Cuevas played solely with Valencia CF during his professional career, helping the Che to three major titles including the 1942 and 1944 conquests of La Liga, to which he contributed a total of 40 games.

He worked as a coach in the 1950s/60s, competing in the top division from 1953 to 1956: after leading Deportivo de La Coruña to the seventh place he was in charge of former club Valencia as it ranked fifth and sixth respectively, even though he did not finish the latter campaign, being fired in May 1956 after losing in the Copa del Rey to Real Jaén.

References

External links

CiberChe stats and bio 

1910 births
1981 deaths
Spanish footballers
Footballers from San Sebastián
Association football midfielders
La Liga players
Segunda División players
Valencia CF players
Levante UD footballers
CD Castellón footballers
Spanish football managers
La Liga managers
Segunda División managers
Valencia CF Mestalla managers
Deportivo de La Coruña managers
Valencia CF managers
Real Betis managers
CD Málaga managers
Hércules CF managers
Moghreb Tétouan managers
Spanish expatriate football managers
Expatriate football managers in Morocco
Spanish expatriate sportspeople in Morocco